Mohammad Ali (born 1 November 1992) is a Pakistani cricketer. He made his Test debut against England in December 2022. He made his first-class debut for Zarai Taraqiati Bank Limited in the 2018–19 Quaid-e-Azam Trophy on 1 September 2018. He was the leading wicket-taker for Zarai Taraqiati Bank Limited in the tournament, with twenty-five dismissals in five matches. He made his List A debut for Zarai Taraqiati Bank Limited in the 2018–19 Quaid-e-Azam One Day Cup on 8 October 2018.

References

External links
 

1992 births
Living people
Pakistani cricketers
 Pakistan Test cricketers
Zarai Taraqiati Bank Limited cricketers
Central Punjab cricketers